Jean Harlow (March 3, 1911 – June 7, 1937) was an American actress who made her uncredited debut in two 1928 films: Honor Bound for Fox Film; and Moran of the Marines for Paramount Pictures. While waiting for a friend at the studio in 1928, she was discovered by studio executives who gave her letters of introduction to casting agencies, where she was offered the two small roles that subsequently launched her film career. During the initial two years of her career, Harlow appeared uncredited in 16 films, including several Hal Roach productions developed for Laurel and Hardy. Her first speaking role was a bit part in the 1929 American pre-Code romantic comedy The Saturday Night Kid, starring Clara Bow and Jean Arthur. The film has since been preserved by the UCLA Film and Television Archive.

Harlow's career breakthrough came In 1930, when she was chosen to star in Hell's Angels, as a last-minute replacement for Norwegian actress Greta Nissen. Harlow was introduced to producer Howard Hughes by her former boyfriend James Hall, one of the film's actors, resulting in Hughes putting her under contract. The film's lead actor Ben Lyon is sometimes given credit for her introduction to Hughes. The movie made her an overnight star with the audiences. Hughes, however, was less than enthusiastic about her, in spite of keeping her under contract. Her feeling towards Hughes were mutual, and her family tried to get her out of her contract. The strained relations were exacerbated by false rumors of a love affair between them. Her performances in movies like The Secret Six (1931), her first film pairing opposite Clark Gable, and The Public Enemy (1931) opposite James Cagney, were not well received. She remained with Hughes, until he agreed to Metro-Goldwyn-Mayer's offer to buy her contract in 1932 for $30,000.

Under exclusive contract to MGM, she became one of the studio's most popular actresses. She starred in Red-Headed Woman (1932), and in Red Dust (1932), which capitalized on her "laughing vamp" image and established her as a film comedienne. From 1933 onward, Harlow was a steady top box office draw for the studio. Among the vehicles she starred in were China Seas (1935) with Clark Gable and Wallace Beery, Suzy (1936) with Cary Grant and Franchot Tone, Libeled Lady (1936) with William Powell, Spencer Tracy, and Myrna Loy, and Personal Property (1937) with Robert Taylor.

During the filming of Saratoga in June 1937, Harlow collapsed on the set, effectively halting the filming. She died on June 7, at the age of 26, the cause of her death attributed to kidney failure. The studio had initial plans to start anew, with either Jean Arthur or Virginia Bruce in Harlow's role, but public backlash led to MGM finishing with Harlow's footage that was already 90% complete. Three Harlow look-alikes were used to fill in the unfinished gaps – one for close-ups, one for long-distance shots, and another to dub Harlow's voice. When the film was released, it became the highest-earning film of her career, and critics proclaimed it her best performance. Harlow's star on the Hollywood Walk of Fame was installed at 6910 Hollywood Boulevard, in Hollywood, California, on February 8, 1960.

Films

Short subjects

Feature length films

Notes

References

Bibliography

Further reading 

Actress filmographies
American filmographies